The Batan scaly-toed gecko (Lepidodactylus balioburius) is a species of gecko. It is endemic to the Philippines.

References

Lepidodactylus
Reptiles described in 1989